The Battle of Argentovaria or Battle of Argentaria was fought in May 378 between the Western Roman Empire and the invading army of the Lentienses, a branch of the Alemanni, at Argentovaria (near Colmar, France). The Alemanni were overwhelmed by the Roman legionaries, though stood their ground bravely. Only 9,000 escaped from the field and Priarius, king of the Lentienses, was slain during the battle. The Lentienses disappear from the historical record following this defeat.

Emperor Gratian, who had given the command of the army for the battle to Nannienus and Mallobaudes, gained the title of Alemannicus Maximus.

References

 Ammianus Marcellinus XV 4 and XXXI 10

378
Argentovaria
Argentovaria
Argentovaria
Argentovaria
History of Haut-Rhin
370s in the Roman Empire
4th century in Roman Gaul